Bodianus bilunulatus, the tarry hogfish, is a species of wrasse native to the Indian Ocean from the African coast to the western Pacific Ocean to Japan, New Caledonia, and the Philippines.

Habitat
It is of minor importance to local commercial fisheries and is also popular as a game fish. It can also be found in the aquarium trade. Other common names include: blackspot wrasse, crescent-banded hogfish, saddle-back hogfish, table boss, and tuxedo hogfish.

Taxonomy
The Hawaiian population of this species has been recently elevated to full species status based on some minor coloration differences, as Bodianus albotaeniatus.

References

bilunulatus
Taxa named by Bernard Germain de Lacépède
Fish described in 1801